Marcel Meisen (born 8 January 1989) is a German cyclo-cross and road cyclist, who currently rides for UCI Continental team . He represented his nation in the men's elite event at the 2016 UCI Cyclo-cross World Championships in Heusden-Zolder.

Major results

Cyclo-cross

2007–2008
 1st  National Under-23 Championships
2013–2014
 1st Dottignies
 1st Woerden
 2nd National Championships
2014–2015
 1st  National Championships
2015–2016
 Toi Toi Cup
1st Slaný
1st Uničov
 1st Fae' Di Oderzo
 1st Pétange
 2nd Woerden
 3rd National Championships
2016–2017
 1st  National Championships
 Toi Toi Cup
1st Uničov
 1st Jingle Cross
 1st Milano
 1st Fae' Di Oderzo
 1st Pétange
 2nd Overall EKZ CrossTour
1st Meilen
2nd Eschenbach
 UCI World Cup
2nd Fiuggi
 3rd Contern
2017–2018
 1st  National Championships
 EKZ CrossTour
1st Hittnau
1st Eschenbach
 1st Milano
 1st Pétange
 2nd Gorizia
 3rd Fae' Di Oderzo
2018–2019
 1st  National Championships
 EKZ CrossTour
1st Meilen
 1st Poprad
 1st Munich
 1st Bensheim
 1st Pétange
 2nd Neerpelt
 Toi Toi Cup
3rd Uničov
2019–2020
 1st  National Championships
 1st Overall EKZ CrossTour
1st Hittnau
1st Meilen
 Toi Toi Cup
1st Mladá Boleslav
 1st Pétange
 1st Poprad
2020–2021
 1st  National Championships
 1st Lützelbach
2021–2022
 1st  National Championships
 1st Fae' Di Oderzo
 1st Pétange
 1st Lützelbach
2022–2023
 1st Gernelle
 1st Lützelbach
 1st Vittorio Veneto
 2nd Bensheim
 3rd Bad Salzdetfurth

Road

2011
 6th Overall Coupe des nations Ville Saguenay
2012
 1st Stage 4 Mi-Août en Bretagne
2013
 1st Stage 3 Boucles de la Mayenne
 1st Stage 6 Tour Alsace
 1st Stage 2 Baltic Chain Tour
2015
 1st  Mountains classification, Course de Solidarność et des Champions Olympiques
 2nd Overall Tour de Gironde
1st Stage 2
 2nd Overall Oberösterreich Rundfahrt
1st Stage 3
 9th Overall Flèche du Sud
2016
 5th Overall Tour de Gironde
 8th Overall Course de Solidarność et des Champions Olympiques
2017
 9th Overall Boucles de la Mayenne
2018
 10th Elfstedenronde
2020
 1st  Road race, National Road Championships
2021
 9th Overall Deutschland Tour

References

External links
 
 
 
 
 

1989 births
Living people
German male cyclists
Cyclo-cross cyclists
People from Stolberg (Rhineland)
Sportspeople from Cologne (region)
Cyclists from North Rhine-Westphalia
21st-century German people